Philip August Frederick (11 March 1779 – 15 December 1846) was Landgrave of Hesse-Homburg from 19 January 1839 until his death. He was a field marshal in the imperial Austrian army.

Life 
He was the third son of Frederick V, Landgrave of Hesse-Homburg, and his wife Caroline. Landgravine Caroline was a daughter of Louis IX, Landgrave of Hesse-Darmstadt, and Countess Palatine Caroline of Zweibrücken, who had received the nickname the Great Landgravine from Johann Wolfgang Goethe.

In 1829, Great Britain proposed to make Philip King of newly independent Greece.  Russia supported this proposal, however, France opposed it.  On 3 February 1830, the great powers settled on Prince Otto of Bavaria, who became the first modern King of Greece as Otto I in 1832.

He died on 1 December 1846 and was buried in the crypt of Bad Homburg Castle.

Military career 
In 1794, he joined the Hesse-Darmstadt brigade, which was stationed in the Netherlands.  He held the rank of captain and was taken prisoner by the French.  He was released ten months later, after his relatives had bought his freedom.

In 1796, he joined the Austrian army.  He took part in the campaigns of 1798, 1799 and 1800.  After the Treaty of Lunéville, he was stationed in Lviv.  In 1805, he was promoted, first to lieutenant colonel, then to colonel and was appointed commander of the Infantry Regiment No. 2 Archduke Ferdinand.

He fought under Archduke Charles in the Battle of Caldiero in 1805 and in the battles of Battle of Landshut and Eckmühl. After the Battle of Aspern-Essling, he was promoted to major general on the battlefield, for his outstanding performance. He was injured during the Battle of Wagram and subsequently received the Military Order of Maria Theresa.

He was transferred to Vienna and his brigade was part of an army corps led by Karl Philipp, Prince of Schwarzenberg.  In 1813, he was promoted to Feldmarschallleutnant and fought in the battles of Dresden, Kulm and Lindenau.  He briefly served as governor of the Grand Duchy of Frankfurt and the Principality of Isenburg.  In February 1814, he assumed command of the 6th German army corps and marched into Lyon on 22 March.

In 1818 and 1820, he travelled to Russia and England, to carry out diplomatic missions.  In 1821, during the early revolutionary of the Risorgimento, he was sent to Naples as commander of an Austrian division, and was then appointed governor of Naples.  In 1825, he was transferred to Graz, in 1827 to Lviv and in 1829 back to Graz.  In 1832, he was promoted to Feldzeugmeister.

On 28 November 1846, shortly before his death, he was promoted to field marshal. This was the highest rank ever achieved by members of the House of Hesse.

Reign 
In 1839, his elder brother Louis William died in Philip inherited Hesse-Homburg.  In 1840, Philip was appointed as governor of Mainz; he left the government of his principality to his younger brother Gustav.

The two major events of his reign were:
 A lease agreement was closed with the brothers François (1806-1877) and Louis Blanc (1806-1852) to operate a casino in Bad Homburg
 In December 1844, the citizens of the landgraviate demanded a constitution — this can be seen as a precursor to the revolutions of 1848.  Philip considered the proposed constitution, however, he eventually rejected the proposal.

Since Philip had no children, Gustav inherited Hesse-Homburg in 1846.

Marriage 
In 1838, Philip married morganatically with Rosalie Antonie, Baroness Schimmelpfennig von der Oye, née Pototschnig.  Elector William II of Hesse-Kassel elevated her to Countess of Naumburg (after Naumburg Castle, in modern Nidderau).  Philip's relatives nevertheless rejected her, on the grounds that she was not a member of the high nobility.  The marriage remained childless.

His wife died on 21 February 1845; he survived her by nearly a year and a half.  She was buried in the crypt of Bad Homburg Castle, where Philip would later be buried as well.

Ancestry

References 
 Ismene Deter: »Der verhinderte Monarch« Prinz Philipp von Hessen und der griechische Thron, in: Aus dem Stadtarchiv — Vorträge zur Bad Homburger Geschichte, 2003/2004, 
 Friedrich Lotz: Geschichte der Stadt Bad Homburg vor der Höhe, vol. II, Frankfurt, 1964
 Fried Lübbecke: Kleines Vaterland: Homburg vor der Höhe, Kramer, Frankfurt, 1964
 Herbert Rosendorfer: Der Prinz von Homburg: Biographie, Munich, 1991
 
 Karl Schwartz: Landgraf Friedrich V. von Hessen-Homburg und seine Familie. Aus Archivalien und Familienpapieren, Rudolstadt, 1878
 

Landgraves of Hesse
Philip
Austrian generals
Recipients of the Order of St. Anna
Knights Cross of the Military Order of Maria Theresa
Grand Crosses of the Order of Saint Stephen of Hungary
Austrian Empire commanders of the Napoleonic Wars
1779 births
1846 deaths
19th-century German people